The 1981–82 SM-liiga season was the seventh season of the SM-liiga, the top level of ice hockey in Finland. 10 teams participated in the league, and Tappara Tampere won the championship.

Standings

Playoffs

Quarterfinal
 Tappara - Kiekko-Reipas 2:0 (7:3, 6:5 P)
 Ässät - Kärpät 2:1 (5:4 P, 4:6, 6:4)

Semifinal
 TPS - Ässät 3:0 (5:4, 5:3, 7:6)
 HIFK - Tappara 2:3 (4:3, 9:2, 3:4, 1:2, 1:2)

3rd place
 HIFK - Ässät 2:1 (7:3, 3:6, 4:2)

Final
 TPS - Tappara 1:3 (2:4, 0:4, 5:4, 2:3)

Relegation
 Jokerit Helsinki - JyP HT Jyväskylä 3:0 (4:1, 5:0, 11:2)
 FoPS Forssa - Lukko Rauma 0:3 (6:11, 3:8, 1:9)

External links
 SM-liiga official website

1981–82 in Finnish ice hockey
Fin
Liiga seasons